Paul E. Schindler Jr. (born September 17, 1952) is an American journalist known for being the software reviewer on the popular television program Computer Chronicles from 1985 to 1999. He worked for 20 years in computer journalism at CMP Technology and Ziff-Davis, including Computer Systems News, Information Systems News, Information Week, PC Week, Byte Magazine, and Windows Magazine.

A 1974 graduate of MIT, he now lives in the San Francisco Bay Area and was a middle-school history teacher at the Joaquin Moraga Intermediate School in Moraga, California. Paul was also a contestant on Jeopardy! in 1985 as well as five other television game shows.

References

1952 births
Living people
Massachusetts Institute of Technology alumni
People from Moraga, California
Benson Polytechnic High School alumni